Trudie is a female given name. Notable people with the name include:

 Trudie Chalder, English professor
 Trudie Goodwin (born 1951), English actress
 Trudie Lamb-Richmond (1931–2021), American educator
 Trudie Lang, English professor
 Trudie Styler (born 1954), English actress

English given names